Hodges, Jamaica is located in Saint Elizabeth, Jamaica. It was the plantation village of Hodges estate which is bordered by the Caribbean Sea to the south and is east of Crawford, Jamaica.

See also
 List of cities and towns in Jamaica

References

External links
 Aerial view
 Photos:

Populated places in Saint Elizabeth Parish